Bình Mỹ may refer to several commune-level subdivisions in Vietnam, including:

Bình Mỹ, Hà Nam, a township and capital of Bình Lục District
Bình Mỹ, Củ Chi, a commune of Củ Chi District in Ho Chi Minh City
Bình Mỹ, Bình Dương, a commune of Bắc Tân Uyên District
Bình Mỹ, Quảng Ngãi, a commune of Bình Sơn District
Bình Mỹ, An Giang, a commune of Châu Phú District